The Toulnustouc River is a tributary of the Manicouagan River in Rivière-aux-Outardes, Côte-Nord, Quebec, Canada.
It is dammed to form Lake Sainte-Anne, which regulates water supply to the huge hydroelectric plants near the mouth of the Manicouagan and also feeds the  Toulnustouc generating station with a capacity of 526 MW, which has been operational since 2005.

Description

According to the Dictionnaire des rivières et lacs de la province de Québec (1914),

Name

Toulnustouc is a term of Innu origin whose meaning is not known.
According to the surveyor J. Bignell, the term means "elbow river" or "angled river" which matches the old name of Rivière du Coude (Elbow River). 
The Geography Commissions of Quebec and Canada define it as "river where they make canoes" or "where canoes are needed". 
There are also different variants: Todnustook, Tudnustouk, Tootnustook, Tulnustuk, Toulnustook and Toulnoustouc.

In the late 1970s, the Innu called it the "Kuetutnustuku Shipu" river, which means river parallel to the Manicouagan River.

Geography

The Toulnustouc River flows through the unorganized territory of Rivière-aux-Outardes. 
It flows southeast through Lac Bardoux and Lac Brûleé, then turns south to Lac Caron, where it is joined by the northeast branch.
The Northeast Toulnustouc River is fed by the Petit lac Manicouagan, and flows southeast and then south before turning west into Lac Caron.
The Cartier Railway runs beside it for most of its length.

The combined Toulnustouc River flows SSE through Lac Fortin and Lac Bouffard and south to Lake Sainte-Anne, a reservoir.
From there it flows southwest past Lac Fléché and south into the Réservoir Manic 2, which is also fed by the Manicouagan River.
A hydroelectric project on the river below Lake Sainte-Anne began in 2001. 
The Toulnustouc generating station (capacity of 526 MW) has been operational since 2005.

Exploitation

The Toulnustouc River was used for logging by Quebec North Shore Paper (now Produits Forestier Résolu). 
On 23 May 1962, a landslide causes the death of nine loggers who were carried into the river.

Recreational fishing is practiced on the river, especially for speckled trout.
The river's surroundings are used for various activities such as fishing, hunting, canoeing, boardwalking, motorcycling and snowmobiling. 
There are also many resort sites.

Notes

Sources

Rivers of Côte-Nord